Ravi Bahadur is an Indian politician and the MLA from Jwalapur Assembly constituency. He is a member of the Indian National Congress.

Ravi Bahadur won with 42372 votes. He defeated Suresh Rathor of Bhartiya Janata Party with 13,376 votes in 2022 Uttarakhand Legislative Assembly election.

References 

Living people
Indian National Congress politicians from Uttarakhand
People from Haridwar district
Uttarakhand MLAs 2022–2027
Year of birth missing (living people)